Nephrotoma ferruginea is a species of large crane fly in the family Tipulidae.

Subspecies
These two subspecies belong to the species Nephrotoma ferruginea:
Nephrotoma ferruginea ferruginea Fabricius, 1805 i g
Nephrotoma ferruginea surtularis (Loew, 1863) i g
Data sources: i = ITIS, c = Catalogue of Life, g = GBIF, b = Bugguide.net

References

Further reading

External links

 
 

Tipulidae
Articles created by Qbugbot
Insects described in 1805